Oliver "OG" Grose III (born August 22, 1989) is an American record producer.

Early life
OG was raised in Nashville, Tennessee, where he was introduced to music as a toddler by his mother, primarily in church. His mother, Quincy Tejeda, is most noted for her professional singing career with the Nashville Super Choir Cast and the Bobby Jones Gospel Show. By the age of 4, he had his own drum kit and developed in skill as he grew older. OG attended Nashville School of the Arts, a fine arts magnet school in Nashville, where he sharpened his skills and became a better musician. Upon completion of high school, OG decided to pursue producing as a full-time career being inspired by predecessors such as Timbaland, Jerome Harmon Danja, Drumma Boy, Neptunes, Teddy Riley, and Ryan Leslie. He taught himself to play piano and began specializing in producing pop, R&B, hip hop, and gospel.

Career
In, 2010, OG was fortunate to link up with fellow producers Fate Eastwood and Matic Lee. Fate & Matic were helpful pieces in aiding OG to build his own sound. Through relationship with both, OG was able to gain great placements (i.e. Yo Gotti, Strange Music)  while being a part of the infamous underground production core the "A-Team." He spent extensive time in different studios doing sessions and gaining knowledge on the commitment it took to produce quality sounding music.  Shortly thereafter, OG invested in his own studio and began working independently.

While working on multiple platforms, OG was approached with an opportunity to become the lead producer of Outlet Records in late 2011. He accepted and began working with Flyer Learning, Tahiem, and Ice Cold Jay, while overseeing the operation of his studio. OG is also working with friend and recording artist Ari Stylez (first introduced on Style network's Chicagolicious), while also producing for sportsmen hip-hop acts such as Iman Shumpert" and O'Brien Schofield. In the summer of 2013, OG was introduced to Dynasty Records Executive Doe, who manages singer/songwriter Mishon. Shortly thereafter he moved to Atlanta, Georgia, to further his opportunities working with Mishon and other acts.

Production credits
Krizz Kaliko - Shock Treatment (2010)  
"Get Around" (ft. Tech N9ne & Kortney Leveringston)
"All Gas No Brakes" (ft. Tech N9ne & 816 Boyz)
Yo Gotti - Cocaine Muzik 4.5 (Da Documentary) (2010)
"Right Now"
"Cocaine Muzik" (ft. Young Jeezy, Rick Ross, & The Clipse)
Stevie Stone - Rolling Stone (2012)
"The Road" (ft. MAG num PI, Wrekonize & Bernz)
"Shine" (ft. Ice Cold Jay, Boochie Ray Ray, & Kaby) Welcome 2 Cashville (With: Ca$hville Records) (2012)
Dave East - Karma 3 (2020) 
"Mission" (ft. Jozzy)

Upcoming releases
Franky Treau (Dead The Competition) - "The Weekend" (ft. Sammie)
Tiffany Green (as yet untitled) - "Jesus the Light" (ft. Mali Music)
Kia Shine (as yet untitled) - "Start Over"

References

External links
Official Website

1989 births
Living people
American electronic musicians
American hip hop musicians
American contemporary R&B singers
African-American rappers
American multi-instrumentalists
American hip hop record producers
Record producers from Kentucky
Record producers from Tennessee
21st-century American rappers
21st-century African-American male singers